This is a list of members of the Western Australian Legislative Assembly between the 1959 election and the 1962 election, together known as the 23rd Parliament.

Notes
 On 25 January 1960, the Labor member for South Fremantle, Dick Lawrence, died. Labor candidate Henry Curran won the resulting by-election on 12 March 1960.
 On 1 July 1961, the Labor member for Victoria Park, Hugh Andrew, died. Labor candidate Ron Davies won the resulting by-election on 26 August 1961.

Members of Western Australian parliaments by term